Geir Suursild (born 13 October 1994) is an Estonian rower. He competed in the men's double sculls event at the 2012 Summer Olympics.

References

1994 births
Living people
Estonian male rowers
Olympic rowers of Estonia
Rowers at the 2012 Summer Olympics
Sportspeople from Pärnu